United Nations Security Council resolution 1618, adopted unanimously on 4 August 2005, after reaffirming resolutions on the situation in Iraq, including Resolution 1546 (2004), the Council condemned terrorist attacks that had taken place in Iraq and expressed its determination to combat terrorism.

Resolution

Observations
The Security Council began by expressing its support for the people of Iraq during the political transition, despite attacks in the country. It reaffirmed resolutions 1267 (1999), 1373 (2001) and 1566 (2004), the United Nations Charter and the need to combat the threat of terrorism. Steps by the Iraqi government to undertake national dialogue were welcomed.

Acts
The resolution condemned terrorist attacks that had taken place in Iraq, particularly those that had taken place in recent weeks, and the kidnapping and attacks on foreign diplomats.  In this regard, the Council expressed condolences to the victims, their families, and the government of Iraq.

The Council affirmed that terrorism could not affect the political and economic transition in Iraq, and all states were called upon to abide by obligations contained in various resolutions concerning terrorism, including to bring the perpetrators, organisers and sponsors of the attacks to justice. Furthermore, they were also asked to assist Iraq in providing protection to foreign diplomatic and United Nations staff, and other foreign civilians working in the country.

See also
 Iraq War
 List of terrorist incidents
 List of United Nations Security Council Resolutions 1601 to 1700 (2005–2006)

References

External links
 
Text of the Resolution at undocs.org

 1618
2005 in Iraq
 1618
 1618
August 2005 events